Beautiful Africa is the fifth studio album by Maliian musician Rokia Traoré. It was released in April 2013 under Nonesuch Records.

Track list

Charts

References

External links
Beautiful Africa by Rokia Traoré at iTunes.com

2013 albums
Nonesuch Records albums
Rokia Traoré albums
Albums produced by John Parish